Eugenic feminism was a component of the women's suffrage movement which overlapped with eugenics. Originally coined by the eugenicist Caleb Saleeby, the term has since been applied to summarize views held by some prominent feminists of the United States. Some early suffragettes in Canada, particularly a group known as The Famous Five, also pushed for eugenic policies, chiefly in Alberta and British Columbia.

Eugenic feminism began to be articulated in the late 1800s and faded in the 1930s, alongside decreasing support for eugenics itself. Eugenic feminists argued that if women were provided with more rights and equality, the deteriorating characteristics of a race could be avoided. They desired gender equality and pushed for eugenic law and science to compromise and meet their views in order to breed a superior race.

History
When Francis Galton originally formulated eugenics, he saw women functioning as a mere conduit to pass desirable traits from father to son. Later eugenicists saw women in a more active role, placing an increasing emphasis on women as “mothers of the race”.  In particular new research in the science of heredity and the studies of procreation, child rearing and human reproduction led to changes in eugenic thought, which began to recognize the importance of women in those parts of the human life cycle. This change in emphasis led eventually to eugenicist Caleb Saleeby coining the term eugenic feminism in his book Woman and Womanhood: A Search for Principles (1911). Saleeby wrote,

The mark of the following pages is that they assume the principle of what we may call Eugenic Feminism, and that they endeavour to formulate its working-out. It is my business to acquaint myself with the literature of both eugenics and feminism, and I know that hitherto the eugenists have inclined to oppose the claims of feminism [...]

Devereux characterizes Saleeby's coining of eugenic feminism as "at least partly a deceptive rhetorical strategy" whose goal was to "draw middle-class women's rights activists back to home and duty".

In the 1930s eugenic feminism began to decline as eugenic feminists began to fall out with mainstream eugenicists, and had largely failed to sway the public opinion.

In Canada
In Canada, all members of the suffragist group known as the "Famous Five" 
(Henrietta Muir Edwards, Nellie McClung, Louise McKinney, Emily Murphy, and Irene Parlby) approved of  eugenics. They supported the 1928 Sexual Sterilization Act of Alberta, and the 1933 Sexual Sterilization Act of British Columbia. Emmeline Pankhurst, the leader of the British suffragettes, spoke in favour of eugenics throughout Western Canada in the 1920s, arguing that Canada as part of the British Empire should strive for "race betterment". Speaking with the Canadian National Committee for Combating Venereal Disease, she often shared a speaking spot with Murphy.

In the United States

Victoria Woodhull 

Victoria Woodhull was a prominent advocate of eugenics. Woodhull also had a husband that was abusive, alcoholic, and disloyal, which she thought that might have contributed to the mental disability of her son, Byron. With her newly sparked interest in eugenics, Woodhull promoted her views by giving addresses and publishing various books. A significant address was made on September 1871 and was titled Children: Their Rights and Privileges in which she claimed that “a perfect humanity must come of perfect children.”

Moreover, she mentioned the importance of having “the best seed” to be able to have children that can grow into functional adults, the nurturing of parents to children, and the wickedness of abortion. With the effort of promoting eugenics by Woodhull, a portion of feminists also started to advocate for eugenics as well. These women thought that there were too many children and supported families that had fewer. In an 1876 speech in New Jersey, Woodhull placed a great importance on eugenics, more than the importance of obtaining the rights for women to vote, mentioning that women's suffrage was unimportant compared to creating a more superior human race.

Woodhull's version of eugenics, which held that adherence to then-prevalent sexual norms led to degenerate offspring, was sharply divergent from the mainstream eugenics of the 1890s. Her views shifted over time, never fully aligning with the eugenicist mainstream, particularly on birth control.

Charlotte Perkins Gilman 

As a leading feminist author of her time, Charlotte Perkins Gilman published various feminist literary works, including poems, articles on eugenics for The Forerunner, and novels such as: Women and Economics, Herland, With Her in Ourland and His Religion and Hers. In Herland, Gilman champions eugenic feminism by imagining an all-female utopian society made up of women who somehow were able to reproduce asexually. They all descended from a single mother, therefore miscegenation was not a problem in her imagined society, neither, it seems, was inheriting undesirable genes, as those who were deemed unfit to reproduce were discouraged from doing so. Gilman’s arguments essentially promoted feminism by “representing eugenic ideology as the source” of help. She advocated equal sexual rights for men and women and advocated legalizing birth control for women.

Decline 
In the 1940s, eugenic feminism began to decline. There were irreconcilable differences between feminism and eugenics that could not accommodate each other. Feminists abandoned their eugenic ideas and opinions when it became harder to gather support and more difficult to combine the two movements. Additionally, support for the eugenics movement as a whole began to wane as the public compared American sterilization practices to the sterilization laws of Nazi Germany which were deemed "totalitarian."

See also
 History of eugenics
 American Birth Control League
 Planned Parenthood

References

Further reading
 
 Devereux, Cecily. "Growing a Race: Nellie L. McClung and the Fiction of Eugenic Feminism." Montreal and Kingston: McGill-Queen's UP, 2005.
 Erika Dyck, “Sterilization and Birth Control in the Shadow of Eugenics: Married, Middle-Class Women in Alberta, 1930-1960s”, CBMH/BCHM 31, No. 1, 2014
 
 

 
Feminist theory
Feminist ethics
Women's suffrage